Heimat Bells is a 1952 West German drama film directed by Hermann Kugelstadt and starring Hansi Knoteck, Armin Dahlen and Ernst Waldow. It was shot at the Bavaria Studios in Munich and on location in Mittenwald in the Bavarian Alps. The film's sets were designed by the art director Max Seefelder.

Cast
 Hansi Knoteck as Maria
 Armin Dahlen as Mathias Brucker

and in alphabetical order
 Siegfried Andree
 Mathias Brucker
 Karl Heinz Diess
 Jenny Dreher
 Albert Florath as Lehrer
 Ulrich Folkmar
 Franz Fröhlich
 Gustl Gstettenbaur
 Olly Gubo
 Wolfgang Keppler
 Anderl Kern
 Auguste Kleinmichl
 Ruth Lommel as Kitty Meier
 Franz Loskarn
 Renate Mannhardt as Zenzi
 Franz Muxeneder as Leo Stanzer
 Sepp Nigg
 Martin Schmidhofer
 Bertl Schultes
 Inge Schulz
 Uli Steigberg
 Gerhard Steinberg
 Rolf Straub
 Kathi Tellheim
 Karl Tischlinger
 Hermann van Dyk
 Alice Verden
 Georg Vogelsang
 Ernst Waldow as Felix Meier
 Mathias Wenzel

References

Bibliography
 Pugh, Emily. The Berlin Wall and the Urban Space and Experience of East and West Berlin, 1961–1989. ProQuest, 2008.

External links 
 

1952 films
1952 drama films
German drama films
West German films
1950s German-language films
German black-and-white films
Films set in Bavaria
Films shot in Bavaria
Films directed by Hermann Kugelstadt
1950s German films
Films shot at Bavaria Studios